Sir Brandon Meredith Rhys-Williams, 2nd Baronet (14 November 1927 – 18 May 1988) was a British Conservative politician.

Family background
His father, Sir Rhys Rhys-Williams, had been a Liberal MP.  His mother, Juliet Rhys-Williams, was another Liberal politician who later joined the Conservative Party and became a member of the Conservative Monday Club. After his father's death, Brandon Rhys-Williams inherited his estate at Miskin.

Parliamentary career
Rhys-Williams contested Pontypridd in 1959, and Ebbw Vale in the 1960 by-election following the death of Aneurin Bevan as well as the same constituency in the following general election. He was defeated each time in these safe Labour seats.

He was elected a Member of Parliament (MP) in the 1968 Kensington South by-election, representing that seat until February 1974, then for Kensington from February 1974 until his death in 1988 aged 60.  He was also a Member of the European Parliament from 1973 until 1984.

The by-election following Rhys-Williams' death, from leukaemia, at the age of sixty, necessitated a by-election in which Kensington was held for the Conservatives by Dudley Fishburn.

References

The Times Guide to the House of Commons, Times Newspapers Ltd, 1987

The National Library for Wales:Digital of Welsh Biography (Sir Brandon Rhys-Williams)

Archives
 Catalogue of the Rhys-Williams papers held at LSE Archives

External links 
 

1927 births
1988 deaths
Conservative Party (UK) MPs for English constituencies
UK MPs 1966–1970
UK MPs 1970–1974
UK MPs 1974
UK MPs 1974–1979
UK MPs 1979–1983
UK MPs 1983–1987
UK MPs 1987–1992
Baronets in the Baronetage of the United Kingdom
Conservative Party (UK) MEPs
MEPs for the United Kingdom 1973–1979
MEPs for England 1979–1984
Deaths from leukemia